The Big Sandy Expedition was an early campaign of the American Civil War in Kentucky that began in mid-September 1861 when Union Brig. Gen. William "Bull" Nelson received orders to organize a new brigade at Maysville, Kentucky and conduct an expedition into the Big Sandy Valley region of Eastern Kentucky and stop the build-up of Confederate forces under Col. John S. Williams. This was done in three phases. From September 21 to October 20, 1861, Nelson assembled a brigade of 5,500 Union volunteers from Ohio and Kentucky. On October 23, the southern prong secured Hazel Green and the northern prong West Liberty. The two prongs were consolidated at Salyersville (Licking Station) and they began the final phase on October 31. This led to the Battle of Ivy Mountain on November 8 and the withdrawal of Confederate forces from Pikeville (Piketon) on November 9, 1861.

Background
During the first week of September 1861, all pretense of neutrality in Kentucky ended when Maj. Gen. Leonidas Polk ordered Brig. Gen. Gideon Pillow advance Confederate troops up to Hickman, Kentucky. On September 18, Kentucky legislature approved the introduction of Federal troops from outside the state, the pro-Confederate legislators staying away. The next day, Simon Bolivar Buckner, former commander of the Kentucky State Guard, established a Confederate headquarters at Bowling Green, Kentucky, while troops under Felix K. Zollicoffer seized Barbourville. Shortly afterwards, Zollicoffer arrived at Cumberland Ford with approximately 3,200 men, consisting of four infantry regiments, a field battery of six guns, and four cavalry companies. This posed an imminent threat to Union control of central Kentucky, at a time when increasing numbers of Confederates in the Big Sandy Valley of eastern Kentucky appeared about to enter the Bluegrass region through McCormack's Gap (Frenchburg). In response, Brig. Gen. George H. Thomas ordered troops from Camp Dick Robinson to southeast Kentucky to halt any movement toward Big Hill, Richmond and Lexington. Former Vice President of the United States John C. Breckinridge and his ally, Col. Humphrey Marshall, added to Thomas's concerns with a call for "Peace Men" and "States' Rights Men" to assemble in Lexington for drill. However, both Breckinridge and Marshall instead rode to Mt. Sterling to join the Confederate forces in western Virginia, where Marshall took command of the Army of Eastern Kentucky posted at Piketon (Pikeville).

Several days later, "Bull" Nelson publicly announced he had established his headquarters at Camp Kenton near Washington, Kentucky and would arm and equip volunteers "to end treason" in Kentucky. The Philadelphia Press wrote that the Big Sandy expedition would prevent the Confederates from taking control of the mouth of the Big Sandy River, where it entered the Ohio River. This would protect the rear and right flank of Brig. Gen. William S. Rosecrans in western Virginia, allowing Nelson to reinforce Wildcat Mountain and to push Zollicoffer back to Knoxville.

Nelson made Olympia[n] Springs (Mud Lick Springs) in Bath County the staging area. He named it Camp Gill on honor of Harrison Gill, owner of the renowned spa eight miles south of Owingsville and twenty miles east of Mount Sterling. The Mt. Sterling-Pound Gap Road (Rt. 460) ran through McCormick's Gap (Frenchburg), the gateway to the Bluegrass Region from Prestonsburg. On September 29, 1861, Maj. John Smith Hurt occupied the vital mountain pass with three militia companies. Col. Lewis Braxton Grigsby added his 300 men to Hurt's 200 on October 8. Col. James Perry Fyffe had the 59th Ohio Volunteer Infantry Regiment march to Camp Kenton, and Col. Leonard A. Harris arrived in Olympian Springs with the 2nd Ohio Volunteer Infantry Regiment. Col. Jesse S. Norton came forward from Nicholasville with the 21st Ohio Volunteer Infantry Regiment, and during the next two weeks, Nelson's forces grew to about 5,500 men, 3,700 from Ohio and 1,800 from Kentucky.

At a farm near Prestonsburg, Confederate captains Andrew Jackson May and John Ficklin assisted "Cerro Gordo" John S. Williams with the organization the 5th Kentucky Infantry. The 1,010-man unit was badly clothed some called the hard-nosed group the "Ragamuffin Regiment." The nine companies of infantry and five mounted companies had two pieces of artillery and they carried an assortment of personal weapons that were ill-suited for warfare.

West Liberty and Hazel Green
On Monday, October 21, 1861, troops that Nelson had assembled Camp Dick Robinson became engaged in a protracted fight with Zollicoffer's Confederates along the Wilderness Road at Wildcat Mountain. The next morning Nelson was unaware of this when he ordered 1,600 men under Col. Leonard Harris to advance  to West Liberty with two artillery pieces. At dawn Wednesday, Nelson was in front of Hazel Green with about 3,500 men and artillery. Thirty-eight of the 200 Confederates surrendered after a brief fight. Twelve miles (19 km) north at West Liberty 500-700 Confederates suffered a loss of 21 dead, 40 wounded, and 34 captured. The Federal loss was two wounded. While Nelson waited for his wagon trains to catch up, he consolidated his forces at Licking Station (Salyersville). The operation resumed on October 31 and on reaching Prestonsburg they found the supposed "Gibraltar of Eastern Kentucky" abandoned.

Ivy Mountain
Thursday, November 7, Col. Joshua W. Sill started the northern prong of the Big Sandy expedition toward John's Creek. From there he was to veer south for about forty miles and gain the rear of the enemy at Pikeville. The following morning, Nelson took the main column of 3,600 men toward Pikeville on the Old State Road (Rt. 460). The West Levisa Fork of the Big Sandy River restricted movement on the right the seven-foot wide path and knee-deep mud forced the artillery to unlimber their guns and rig them so they could follow the infantry forward in a single file. Directly to their front, there were 250 Confederates some  up the hill and hidden behind rocks, trees, and bushes. About 1:00 p.m., that hillside exploded with blue smoke from the doubled-barreled shotguns and old muskets carried by the Confederates. In the next instant, four Union soldiers were dead and another 13 lay on the ground wounded. Nelson rushed forward with his saber drawn, climbed up on a conspicuously located rock, and told his men "that if the Rebels could not hit him they could not hit any of them." He ordered the 2nd Ohio Infantry and 21st Ohio Infantry to push up side of the mountain and flank the enemy position from the north. At the same, Nelson had two light artillery pieces take a position near mouth of Ivy Creek and West Levisa Fork and fire directly into the enemy breastworks.

About 2:20 p.m., the 21st Ohio Infantry  arrived at the top of hill. They rolled large boulders down on the Confederates who ran off in every direction. One half-hour later, Captain May had his men felling trees and burning bridges to retard pursuit. The Battle of Ivy Mountain (Ivy Narrows) was a clear victory for the Union force under Nelson who had gained full control of the field at a loss of six killed and 24 wounded. The opposing Confederates had 10 dead, 15 wounded, and 50 missing or taken prisoner. Nelson ended the pursuit beyond a burned bridge at Coldwater Creek and near the home of Unionist Lindsay Layne. Williams continued on to Pikeville where he posted a rear guard of 400 men to cover a withdrawal to Pound Gap with the remainder of his force. At 3:00 a.m. Saturday, November 9, Nelson had his troops back in pursuit. Terrible road conditions retarded movement and by nightfall, he remained  from Pikeville. Early Sunday, November 10, Nelson had come to within several miles of the objective when a detachment from Joshua Sill's northern prong rode forward to advise they had secured the town at 4:00 p.m. Saturday.

In Pound Gap, Colonel Williams reported that Nelson had dispersed an "unorganized and half-armed, barefooted squad" that lacked everything, but the will to fight. The Cincinnati Commercial noted that Nelson had shown how "troops could be moved across unforgiving terrain without adequate transportation." That determination had truly surprised Williams who believed that Nelson would continue into Virginia with the intent of destroying the Virginia & Tennessee Railroad, a line that connected the Confederate capital at Richmond, Virginia with the Memphis, Tennessee and the Mississippi Valley at Knoxville. In the first accounts of the fighting at Ivy Mountain, Northern news correspondents grossly misrepresented events because their Northern audience wanted a quick conclusion to the war. Those mistakes led the Cincinnati Gazette to conclude that while a great victory had been attained, the "campaign in Eastern Kentucky has no more permanent effect than the passage of a showman's caravan. Five hundred rebel guerrilla cavalry will undo in a week the ornamental work . . . done at so great an expenditure of money and of most precious time." The latter issues were of great concern and the reason why Brig. Gen. Don Carlos Buell replaced Brig. Gen. William T. Sherman in Louisville. Nelson received orders to report there and his brigade followed on Sunday afternoon, November 24. As predicted, the Confederates returned and that brought Col. James A. Garfield into the region to resume the unfinished task of subduing them.

See also
 List of battles fought in Kentucky

References

This article was derived from chapter six of Donald A. Clark's, The Notorious "Bull" Nelson: Murdered Civil War General. Carbondale: University of Southern Illinois Press, 2011.The bibliography for, "A Showman's Caravan": 63-78, follows:

Federal and state publications
Federal Writers Project. Military History of Kentucky. Frankfort, 1939.
Ohio Historical Society. Correspondence to the Governor and Adjutant General 1861–66, Vols. 1A-34 of Series 147
United States. War Department. The War of the Rebellion: A Compilation of the Official Records of the Union and Confederate Armies. Series 1, 2, 3. 70 vols. 128 serials. Washington: 1880–1901.
__. War Department .The War of the Rebellion: Supplement to the Official Records of the Union and Confederate Armies. Edited by Janet B. Hewett et al. 100 volumes. Wilmington, N. C.: Broadfoot's Publishing Co., 1994–2006.
Published diaries, personal papers, reminiscences, memoirs, speeches, and other original narratives
Beatty, William Thacker. "William Thacker Beatty, Journals 1-4" in the Buffalo County Beacon, Gibbon, Nebraska, February 9, 1883.
Bowling Green State University, Center for Archival Collections, Bowling Green, Ohio.Loyal B. Wort Correspondence 1861–1864, MS 700; Robert H. Caldwell Papers 1861–1863, MS 623; Robert S. Dilworth Papers, MS 800.
 Fyffe, James Perry, Letters (Civil War) MS 220. Chattanooga Public Library. Chattanooga, Tennessee.
Guerrant, Rev. Edward O. "Marshall and Garfield in Eastern Kentucky." Battles and Leaders of the Civil War. Robert U. Johnson and Clarence C. Buel. eds. 4 vols. New York: "Century Magazine", 1887. 1: 393-97.
Joyce, John A. A Checkered Life. Chicago: S. P. Rounds Jr.: 1883.
Moore, Frank. ed., The Rebellion Record: A Diary of American Events with Documents, Narratives, Illustrative Incidents, Poetry, etc. 12 vols. New York. G.P. Putnam, 1861–68.
Lafferty, W. T. ed. "The Civil War Reminiscences of John Acker Lafferty." Register of the Kentucky Historical Society 59 (January 1961).
Parsons, Thomas W. Frank F. Mathias, ed. Incidents & Experiences in the Life of Thomas W. Parsons from 1826 to 1900. Lexington: University Press of Kentucky, 1975.
Spafford, Ara C. 1st Sergeant, C Company, 21st Ohio Volunteer Infantry. Letter to the Perrysburg (Oh.) Journal. November 14, 1861.
Rudy, Winchester Byron. Civil War Diary. October 17, 1861 – June 17, 1864. University of Kentucky Special Collections. Lexington, Kentucky.
Scheets, George. "Memoir of Adjutant George Scheets, C Company, 21st Ohio Volunteer Infantry" A Special Report: War Reminiscences," a paper read at the regular meeting of Ford Post, East Toledo, Ohio, December 1883.
Stevenson, Daniel. "General Nelson, Kentucky, and Lincoln Guns." Magazine of American History 10 (August 1883): 115-39.
Thompson, Robert Means and Richard Wainwright, eds., Confidential Correspondence of Gustavus Vasa Fox Assistant Secretary of the Navy 1861–1865. vol. 1. New York: De Vinne Press, 1918.
Tremewan, Paul, ed., As Near Hell as I Ever Expect to Be.: The Civil War Letters of Lieutenant John V. Patterson of the 21st Regiment, Ohio Volunteer Infantry. Xlibris, 2011.
Regimental histories
Baumgartner, Richard. The Bully Boys: In Camp and Combat With the 2nd Ohio Volunteer Infantry Regiment, 1861-1864. Blue Acorn Press, 2013.
Canfield, S. S. History of the 21st Regiment Ohio Volunteer Infantry. Toledo: Vrooman, Sanders & Bateman Printers, 1893.
Hannaford, E. The Story of a Regiment: A History of the Campaigns and Association in the Field of the Sixth Regiment of Ohio Volunteer Infantry.Cincinnati: Private Printing, 1868.
Nichol, Everett A. and Marie. Battered Destinies. Pasadena: 1996. Edited reprint of A Committee  [Samuel Cordell Frey et al.] A Military Record of Battery D, First Ohio Veteran Volunteer Light Artillery. Oil City: Derrick Publishing Company, 1906–08.
Quinlan, Bradley and Joshua Haugh. Duty Well Performed : The Twenty-First Ohio Volunteer Infantry in the Civil War. Milford, Ohio: Little Miami Publishing, 2011.
Speed, Thomas, R. M. Kelly, and Alfred Pirtle. The Union Regiments of Kentucky. Louisville: Courier-Journal, 1897.
Van Horne, Thomas B. History of the Army of the Cumberland: Its Organization, Campaigns, Battles, Written at the Request of General George H. Thomas. 1875. Reprint. New York: Smithmark Publishers, 1996.
Secondary sources
Clift, G. Glenn. History of Maysville and Mason County. Lexington: Transylvania Printing,1936.
Collins, Richard H., and Collins, Lewis. History of Kentucky. 2 vols. Covington, 1874. Reprint. Berea: Kentucky Imprints, 1976.
Harrison, Lowell H. The Civil War in Kentucky. Lexington: University Press of Kentucky, 1975.
Perkins, Marlitta H. The Most Brilliant Little Victory. Lulu, 2014.
Perrin, William H., ed. History of Fayette County, Kentucky. Chicago: O. L. Baskin & Co., 1882.
_. J. H. Battle, and G. C. Kniffin, eds. "Kentucky: A History of the State."Louisville: F. A. Battey and Company, 1887. Reprint. Southern Historical Press, 1979.
Perry, Robert. Jack May's War. Johnson City, Tennessee: The Overmountain Press, 1998.
Preston, John David. The Civil War in the Big Sandy Valley of Kentucky. Baltimore: Gateway Press, 1984.
Speed, Thomas. The Union Cause in Kentucky, 1860–1865. New York: G. P. Putnam's Sons, 1907.
Articles
Scalf, Henry P. "The Battle of Ivy Mountain," "Register of the Kentucky Historical Society" 56 (January 1958).
"Beginning of the War in Kentucky," "The Scientific American", New Series 5 (October 5, 1861).
Newspapers
Cincinnati Commercial, November 14, 1861.
Cincinnati Gazette, November 16, 18, 1861.
Covington (Ky.) Journal, November 9, September 21, 1861.
New York Times, November 4, 8, 17, 22, 25, 26, September 28, 1861.
Lexington (Ky.) Herald, June 7, 1908.
Lexington Observer & Reporter, October 19, 1861
Paris (Ky.) Western Citizen, November 1, 1861.
Philadelphia Press, October 29, November 22, 1861.
Weekly Gazette and Free Press (Janesville, Wisconsin), November 22, 1861.

Also see:
 National Park Service battle description
 CWSAC Report Update - Kentucky
 [www.bencaudill.com/documents_msc/5th.html]
 [civilwar.morganco.freeservers.com/ajmay.htm]
 [civilwar.morganco.freeservers.com/ivymountain.htm]
 [www.flickr.com/photos/kaintuckeean/6037289648/]

Battles of the Operations in Eastern Kentucky of the American Civil War
Battles of the Western Theater of the American Civil War
Union victories of the American Civil War
Floyd County, Kentucky
1861 in Kentucky
1861 in the American Civil War
Battles of the American Civil War in Kentucky
October 1861 events
November 1861 events